Bellshill Athletic Football Club is a Scottish football club based in the town of Bellshill, North Lanarkshire.

History
The history of the club can be traced back as far as 1897 when Bellshill Athletic were founded as a Juvenile club who played at Hawthorn Park. After two successful years as a Juvenile club, Athletic transferred to Junior level. The area had three other clubs at this time - Bellshill Thistle, Mossend Celtic and Mossend Brigade. On 6 August 1902 Bellshill merged with another local club, Clydesdale Wanderers, to form Bellshill & Clydesdale United. This new club only lasted for two seasons before folding, meanwhile a new Bellshill Athletic had been set-up in 1903 and this is the club that still exists today. In 1973, a Mossend pub named The Derby Inn became sponsors, after which the club became the first in Britain to have a sponsor displayed on their shirt.

The club's early years had it based at many homes. These included Orbiston Park, Douglas Park and Brigade park. The club's previous ground, Brandon Park, was officially opened in 1903 in a friendly against Blantyre Victoria in the month of August that year. On the club's centenary year, they were then based at a new location, New Brandon Park, in the Hattonrigg area of the town. However, due to legal matters with the owner, the club were forced to abandon the ground and, after a brief stint in Blantyre, were permitted to move temporarily to the local Sir Matt Busby Sports Complex. After this agreement expired, the club entered a groundsharing arrangement with Vale of Clyde at their Fullarton Park ground in Tollcross, Glasgow for the 2011–12 season. In 2015, the club moved back to Bellshill at Rockburn Park, while planning to move  to a new community facility at Bellshill Academy.

The largest crowd seen in the club's history was around about 10,000 people who witnessed a Scottish cup sixth round tie against St Roch's. The game ended in a victory for St Roch's.

Professional footballer Billy Moffatt sterted his playing career at Belshill Athletic.

Bellshill have played at Junior level since 1899, with an exception of a short spell (1927–1931) during which they played in the Intermediate League. As Juniors they have played in four different leagues: The Lanarkshire League, The Scottish League, Central League and the present West Region. The club were to suffer relegation from the Stagecoach Super League Premier Division in season 2009–10.

References

External links
 Official club website
 New Facebook Page
 Twitter

 
Football clubs in Scotland
Football in North Lanarkshire
Scottish Junior Football Association clubs
Association football clubs established in 1897
1897 establishments in Scotland
Bellshill
West of Scotland Football League teams